Care of the Critically Ill Surgical Patient (CCrISP) is a training programme for surgical doctors.  The course covers the theoretical basis and practical skills required to manage critically ill surgical patients.  It is managed by the Royal College of Surgeons of England.  The 4th edition, which reduced the duration to 2 days, was released in February 2017.

Background
CCrISP was designed by Mr. Iain Anderson, Senior Lecturer in Surgery, Manchester University, for the Royal College of Surgeons of England, as a result of the Hillsborough disaster.  The first course was run in 1998 by the Hillsborough Trust.  The 2nd edition was published in 2003, the 3rd in 2010 and the current (4th edition) in 2017.

Training bodies
In addition to the RCS England, CCrISP courses are run by the following surgical training bodies:
Academy of Medicine of Malaysia
Royal Australasian College of Surgeons
Royal College of Surgeons in Ireland (RCSI)
Royal College of Surgeons of Edinburgh

Eligibility

United Kingdom
Courses are open to doctors who have completed the Foundation Programme and is usually taken during ST1-3 or CT1-2 training. Courses run throughout the year in regional centres across the UK, and until late 2020 at RCS Partner centres in London and Manchester.

Australia and New Zealand
The Royal Australasian College of Surgeons requires surgical trainees to complete CCrISP within the first 2 years of training (SET 1-2).  The course is also mandatory for trainees in oral and maxillofacial surgery.

Ireland
The Royal College of Surgeons in Ireland recommends at least 6 months of general surgery training before taking the course.  Irish courses are aimed at surgical trainees in the second year of Basic Surgical Training (ST2).   Candidates must be registered with the Medical Council (Ireland) or the General Medical Council.

Content
The course runs with a maximum of 16 students and 9 faculty, one of whom will be a Course Director. Ideally, the ratio of Surgeon to Anaesthetist faculty will be 50/50. Candidates receive a course manual and must pass a pre-course online multiple choice question assessment.  Successful participants receive a certificate from the Royal College of Surgeons of England.

The main course elements include:
 Presentation of the critically ill patient
 Assessment and detection of illness
 Formulation of a plan of action
 Seeking assistance and support
 Prevention of complications
 Recognition of complications
 Interaction with colleagues
 Requirements of patients and relatives during critical illness
 Legal, ethical, and communication issues

Theory stations include:
 Cardiac disorders
 Communication skills
 Conducting a surgical ward round
 Pain
 Renal dysfunction
 Respiratory failure
 The multiply injured patient

Practical skills stations include:
 Advanced shock
 Airway management
 Arterial line insertion
 Central venous pressure line insertion
 Chest x-ray interpretation
 Dysrhythmias
 Pressure monitoring
 Stoma care
 Tracheostomy
 Wound assessment

Assessment 
CCrISP uses a mix of formative and summative assessment.  The pre course online MCQ is summative assessed, whilst the bulk of the two days is formatively assessed.  The end of course moulage is summatively assessed, and the students are given a pass / fail mark.  Those who fail, either through missing a session, or not passing the moulage, can resit the failed element, but this resit must take place within 6 months of the course. If outside that date the whole course must be repeated.

Instructor training 
Surgeons, Anaesthetists or Intensivists wishing to become CCrISP faculty need to be at least Post Graduate year 7 (ST5 in the UK) before they are eligible.  There are two route to becoming an instructor, the CCrISP Instructor course and Instructor Candidate.  To enrol on the Instructor course participants need to have observed or been a successful student on a CCrISP course.  The Instructor course last two days and includes educational theory and practical sessions during which participants simulate a cross section of CCrISP course stations. The Instructor Candidate route requires participants to have completed basic educational training (a two-day intro to training is usually sufficient) or have done another Instructor course with educational content, such as ATLS Instructor. They also need to have seen a CCrISP course or passed one.  Once these requirements have been met they act as an instructor on a course and are assessed by the Course Director. If successful they become a CCrISP faculty member.

See also
 ABC (medicine)
 Advanced Cardiac Life Support
 Advanced Life Support
 Advanced trauma life support
 Basic Life Support
 Definitive Surgical Trauma Skills
 Pediatric Advanced Life Support
 Trauma team
 List of emergency medicine courses

References

Emergency medicine courses
Medical credentials